is a Japanese superhero manga series written and illustrated by Kōhei Horikoshi.

My Hero Academia may also refer to:

My Hero Academia: Smash!!, 2015 manga series
My Hero Academia: Vigilantes, 2016 manga series
My Hero Academia: Team-Up Missions, 2019 manga series
My Hero Academia (season 1), 2016
My Hero Academia (season 2), 2017
My Hero Academia (season 3), 2018
My Hero Academia (season 4), 2019–2020
My Hero Academia (season 5), 2021
My Hero Academia (season 6), 2022–2023
My Hero Academia: Two Heroes, 2018 film
My Hero Academia: Heroes Rising, 2019 film
My Hero Academia: World Heroes' Mission, 2021 film

See also
My Hero (disambiguation)